This is a list of airports in Darwin Northern Territory.



List of airports
The list is sorted by the name of the community served, click the sort buttons in the table header to switch listing order.

Defunct airports

See also
List of airports in the Northern Territory

References

 
Airports
Airports in Darwin
Darwin
Transport in Darwin, Northern Territory